The Classic 22 is an American trailerable sailboat that was designed by Stuart Windley as a cruiser and first built in 1989.

The Classic 22 (Windley) is a development of the Gloucester 22, that been built by Gloucester Yachts.

The design was originally marketed by the manufacturer as the Classic 22, but is now usually referred to as the Classic 22 (Windley) to differentiate it from the unrelated 1962 Classic 22 design by George Harding Cuthbertson and produced by Grampian Marine.

Production
The design was built by Classic Yachts in Chanute, Kansas, United States, starting in 1989, but it is now out of production.

Design
The Classic 22 (Windley) is a recreational keelboat, built predominantly of fiberglass, with wood trim. It has a fractional sloop rig and a fixed stub keel, with a retractable centerboard. It displaces  and carries  of ballast.

See also
List of sailing boat types

References

Keelboats
1990s sailboat type designs
Sailing yachts
Trailer sailers
Sailboat type designs by Stuart Windley
Sailboat types built by Classic Yachts